Xieliang, a county in the Hedong Commandery during the Qin and Han Dynasties.  In Chapter one of Romance of the Three Kingdoms, Guan Yu states that he is from Xieliang County in the Hedong Commandery.

Administrative divisions of ancient China